Hard Machine is the second studio album by American singer Stacey Q, released in February 1988 by Atlantic Records. After the international success of her song "Two of Hearts" and debut album Better Than Heaven (1986), Swain began working on her sophomore record. She again collaborated with her bandmates from SSQ. Produced by Jon St. James, Hard Machine is a dance-pop album, which is influenced by new wave, contemporary R&B and rock music.

Upon its release, Hard Machine received generally positive reviews from music critics and noted a small commercial success, peaking at number 115 on the Billboard 200.

Three singles were released from the album. The lead single,  "Don't Make a Fool of Yourself" (Shep Pettibone Remix), released on March 25, 1988, peaked at number 19 on the Hot Crossover 30, Number 4 on the Billboard Hot Dance Club Songs, Number 1 on the Top 12 inch Singles Sales chart, and also peaking at number 66 on the Billboard Hot 100. The second single "I Love You" peaked at Number 49 on the Billboard Hot Dance Club Songs. "Favorite Things" was released as a promotional single.

Track listing
 "Good Girl" (K. Fisher, M. Stein) (4:02)
 "Favorite Things" (J. St. James, S. Swain) (4:10)
 "Kiss It All Goodbye" (J. St. James, S. Swain) (3:47)
 "Don't Make A Fool Of Yourself" (S. Hahn, J, St. James, S. Swain) (4:08)
 "The River" (J. St. James, S. Swain) (5:06)
 "I Love You" (J. St. James, S. Swain) (4:35)
 "Temptation" (K. Fisher, M. Stein) (3:51)
 "Hard Machine" (J. St. James, S. Swain) (3:16)
 "After Hours" (J. St. James, S. Swain) (3:26)
 "Another Chance" (S. Hahn, S. Swain) (4:05)

Credits and personnel

SSQ
 Stacey Q. - lead vocals, backing vocals
 Skip Hahn - keyboards, guitar, backing vocals
 Karl Moet - drums, sampling, percussion
 Rich West - keyboards, arrangement on track 10
 Jon St. James - keyboards, drums, percussion

Additional Musicians
 Scott Bowers - guitar (tracks 1, 7)
 Eddie Reddick - vocals (tracks 1, 7)
 Rusty Anderson - guitar (track 8)
 Joe Cristina - Formula 1 horns
 John Deemer - Formula 1 horns
 Victor Cajiao - Formula 1 horns
 Michael Stein - additional keyboards
 Kirk Fisher - additional keyboards

Production
 Tony Mandich - creative consultant
 Anthony Sanfilippo - creative consultant
 Keith Zajic - creative consultant
 Keith Cowen - creative consultant
 Paul Cooper - production coordinator
 Larry Yasgar - production coordinator
 Karl Moet - assistant engineer
 Jimi Yamagishi - assistant engineer
 Digital Magnetics/Ted Hall - digital mastering
 Danny Mendellin - hair
 La Lotte - make-up
 Mike Jones - photography
 Dennis King - mastering
 Romi Marie - management/Formula 1

References

External links
[ Hard Machine] at AllMusic

1988 albums
Stacey Q albums
Atlantic Records albums